is a  mountain in Sasayama, Hyōgo, Japan.
 
Mount Nishi-ga-take is the second highest mountain in the Taki Mountains after Mount Mitake.

Access
 Kurikara Guchi Bus Stop of Shinki Bus

References
 Natural Parks of Hyōgo Prefecture
 Official Home Page of the Geographical Survey Institute in Japan

Nishigatake
Shugendō